Temptation of Wife may refer to:

 Temptation of Wife (South Korean TV series), a 2008 television series
 Temptation of Wife (Philippine TV series), a 2012 television series